French Hill is an unincorporated community in Del Norte County, California. It lies at an elevation of 1863 feet (568 m).

References

External links

Unincorporated communities in California
Unincorporated communities in Del Norte County, California